John Robert Jones (July 27, 1876 – July 30, 1972) was an American politician in the state of Washington. He served in the Washington House of Representatives from 1923 to 1955.

References

1972 deaths
1876 births
People from Lyons, Nebraska
People from Waterville, Washington
Democratic Party members of the Washington House of Representatives